Richmond School, also known as Richmond School and Sixth Form College, is a historic British school in Yorkshire near Richmond, England. Alternatively, it may refer to:

in Canada
School District 38 Richmond, Richmond, British Columbia, Canada

in the United Kingdom
Richmond School of Art (1947–54), in Richmond-on-Thames, London

in the United States
West Contra Costa Unified School District, formerly Richmond Unified School District, Richmond, California
Richmond High School of Richmond Community Schools, Richmond, Michigan
 Richmond School (Philadelphia, Pennsylvania), listed on the National Register of Historic Places (NRHP) in northeast Philadelphia